Ladoora  is a notified area and village in the Baramulla district, Jammu and Kashmir, India. It is located on the banks of River Jhelum.  It is approximately seven kilometers from Sopore and 8 kilometres from Baramulla.
Ladoora has a playground known by the name of Nagbal cricket ground. 
Ladoora Rafiabad is known for fruit business. 

Several business and political personalities belong to Ladoora Rafiabad.

References

Villages in Baramulla district